One By Two is a 2014 Hindi romantic comedy directed by Devika Bhagat. It released on 31 January 2014 at multiplexes, showing on approximately 500 screens in India. This is the story of Amit and Samara who meet each other while living in Mumbai The music of the film has been composed by Shankar–Ehsaan–Loy. The film was panned by critics.

Plot
Amit Sharma (Abhay Deol) is living a dull personal and professional life. His girlfriend Radhika recently dumped him and he's still not over her. His colleagues constantly mock him for it. On his parents recommendation he meets a girl named Shishika(Yashika Dhillon) but doesn't gets over Radhika.

Samara Patel (Preeti Desai) wants to become a great dancer. She lives with her alcoholic mother (Lillete Dubey) . Samara and Jonathan (Yudishtir Urs) are together, Jonathan constantly wants to make out while doesn't want any "Love" in between. During a rehearsal Samara gets close to a guy while Jonathan finds it unable to handle and rejects her name for a mega dance campaign. Samara gets herself enrolled for a dance reality show. Amit gets to know Radhika left him for a show producer Ranjan (Diwakar Pundir) who in turn is the producer of the Dance Reality show Samara is participating. To belittle Ranjan and to win back Radhika, Amit hacks the list of Dance Reality Show's winners. While he changes the list, and those who are accustomed to win, gets eliminated. The show loses its charm and Ranjan faces abuses from the audience. While due to Amit's childish behaviour Samara who was performing outstandingly gets eliminated.

Amit again visits Radhika and proposes her. She calls him boring and useless. Samara meets her father who left her mother due to her alcoholism. Her father asks her to leave her Mom and move back with him. Samara and her mother shares an heated argument regarding the same. Samara finds that her father doesn't loves her when he during a party doesn't acknowledge her as his daughter.

Amit finds Shishika irritating. At a party in a bathroom, Amit gives Samara toilet paper when she accidentally sneaks into Men's bathroom. But they both doesn't meet each other.

During a family interrogation with Shishika's parents, Amit gets his guitar and sings in front of them wearing a vest and short, thus embarrassing in a discontented mood. With the help of his dance partner, Samara choreographs a dance album. It gets instant views and liking. Unknowingly its on the song made by Amit. Samara and his friend got the song when Amit accidentally dropped the Hard Disk on the road bumping to Samara one day. They give credits to Amit.

Radhika comes back, to reunite back with Amit, but he refuses to accept her. He promises her that he will sing the song for her dance show, which will be played after the contestant wins the show. As a wildcard entry Samara gets back into the dance show she previously got eliminated. Radhika asks her producers not to play Amit's song, in turn Samara takes the song for her final dance. Jonathan comes back to Samara to rekindle. After a make out session when Jonathan asks her to come back to Amsterdam she refuses and asks Jonathan to leave. Samara rekindles her relationship with her mom and tells her father that she will stay with her mother and will not come with him.

Everyone watches, including Amit the breathtaking performance of Samara. At the time of results, Samara sneaks out with her mother. The show declares someone else as winner, because Samara just Vanished without telling. Everyone gets astonished as Samara hasn't won the show.

Lastly, Samara through an accident in a pub finally meets Amit, while he praises her for her dance during the show and she for his song.

Samara's mom, Amit, his friends all finally together meet each other.

Cast 
 Abhay Deol as Amit Sharma
 Preeti Desai as Samara Patel
 Rati Agnihotri as Meenu Sharma, Amit's mother
 Jayant Kripalani as Sushil Sharma, Amit's father
 Lillete Dubey as Kalpana Patel, Samara's mother
 Anish Trivedi as Samara's father
 Darshan Jariwala as ACP Dhawan, Amit's uncle
 Netarpal Singh Heera as Bunty
 Yudishtir Urs as Jonathan Rebello
 Preetika Chawla as Anika
 Tahir Raj Bhasin as Mihir Deshpande 
 Geetika Tyagi as Radhika Rupani
 Maya Sarao as Shaila 
 Yashika Dhillon as Shishika Kalra
 Dr. Rajesh Asthana as Mr. Reddy
 Diwakar Pundir as Ranjan Sadanah
 Shrishti Arya as Promila
 Tanvir Singh as Host of dance show
 B.K. Tiwari as ACP Salgaonkar
 Neelam Sharma as Inspector Chowgule
 Hemant Soni as Halwaldar More
 Amit Shukla as Inspector Shetty

Critical reception
The film was panned by critics.

Film critic Subhash K Jha writes that One by Two is "irresistible in parts" and "never disappoints." He says there is a "winsome, bubbly bouncy and ebullient quality to this take on urban aspirations."

Soundtrack

Controversy

Abhay Deol had a falling out with music company T-Series after the composers from his film Shankar–Ehsaan–Loy were asked to sign, what they believed to be illegal clauses which would hand over their [the author's] rights to royalty over to the music company. Abhay Deol took to social media and blamed T-Series for delaying the music launch of his film as well as not promoting the movie due to him and the composers not agreeing to sign the documents. This allegation was denied by T-Series who claimed that they had uploaded 3 songs from the movie on its YouTube page and claimed "In the absence thereof [of appropriate agreements], we cannot be expected to release music when there is no clarity with respect to the rights granted to the producer" In another statement, T-Series expressed the fact that they had been assured by the company Viacom 18 that they owned all the rights (including the music rights) and that they did not understand why they were being dragged into this dispute which should be between Mr. Deol and Viacom 18. T-Series eventually relinquished their hold on the music rights after a campaign was run by the composers and artists against the music company. Eventually the music for the film was launched after music companies Crecendo and Unisys who took over, with the former releasing the physical copies and the latter releasing the digital copies of the music online. The music was released 5 days before the film's theatrical release.

Box office
One By Two collected Rs 2.25–25.0 million nett in its first week, mostly from multiplexes in Mumbai and Delhi. Box Office India called the business "very poor".

References

External links
 

2010s Hindi-language films
2014 films
Indian romantic comedy films
Films set in Mumbai
Viacom18 Studios films
2014 romantic comedy films